Kabelo Dambe (born 10 May 1990) is a Motswana footballer who currently plays for Township Rollers and the Botswana national football team as a goalkeeper.

Honours

Clubs
 Township Rollers
Botswana Premier League:4
2009-10, 2010-11, 2015-16, 2016-17
FA Cup:1
2009-10
Mascom Top 8 Cup:1
2011-12

Individual
Coca Cola Cup Goalkeeper of the Tournament: 2010
Botswana Premier League Player of the Season: 2010
Botswana Premier League Players' Player of the Season: 2010
Mascom Top 8 Cup Goalkeeper of the Tournament: 2012
Botswana Premier League Goalkeeper of the Season: 2016

References

External links
 
 

1990 births
Living people
People from Francistown
Botswana footballers
Botswana international footballers
Botswana expatriate footballers
Township Rollers F.C. players
Platinum Stars F.C. players
Botswana expatriate sportspeople in South Africa
Expatriate soccer players in South Africa
2012 Africa Cup of Nations players
Association football goalkeepers